The 2022 V-League Collegiate Challenge is the first conference of the V-League (14th season of the V-League franchise; 41st conference of the former Shakey's V-League) after it relaunched this year after six years. It is the inaugural competition of the V-League as a standalone tournament after being tied with Shakey's Pizza in the past as their title sponsor. 

The tournament began on October 16 for men's with 12 teams while October 19 for women's with 8 teams.

Participating teams

Venue

Format

Men's 
 Preliminary round
 Single-round robin preliminaries; 2 pools (6 teams each); Teams are ranked using the FIVB Ranking System.
 Top four teams from each pools will advance to the quarterfinals.
 Bottom two teams from each pools will battle for 9th–12th places classification.
 Quarterfinals (knockout series)
 QF1: A1 vs. B4
 QF2: B2 vs. A3
 QF3: B1 vs. A4
 QF4: A2 vs. B3
 Losing teams will battle for 5th–8th places classification.
 Semifinals (knockout series)
 SF1: QFW1 vs. QFW2
 SF2: QFW3 vs. QFW4
 Finals
 Bronze medal: SF1L vs. SF2L
 Gold medal (best-of-three series): SF1W vs. SF2W

Women's 
 Preliminary round
 Single-round robin preliminaries; 2 pools (4 teams each); Teams are ranked using the FIVB Ranking System.
 All teams will advance to the quarterfinals.
 Quarterfinals (knockout series)
 QF1: A1 vs. B4
 QF2: B2 vs. A3
 QF3: B1 vs. A4
 QF4: A2 vs. B3
 Losing teams will battle for 5th–8th places classification.
 Semifinals (knockout series)
 SF1: QFW1 vs. QFW2
 SF2: QFW3 vs. QFW4
 Finals
 Bronze medal: SF1L vs. SF2L
 Gold medal (best-of-three series): SF1W vs. SF2W

Pools composition

Men's

Women's

Pool standing procedure 
 Number of matches won
 Match points
 Sets ratio
 Points ratio
 If the tie continues as per the point ratio between two teams, the priority will be given to the team which won the last match between them. When the tie in points ratio is between three or more teams, a new classification of these teams in the terms of points 1, 2 and 3 will be made taking into consideration only the matches in which they were opposed to each other.

Match won 3–0 or 3–1: 3 match points for the winner, 0 match points for the loser

Match won 3–2: 2 match points for the winner, 1 match point for the loser.

Squads

Men's tournament

Preliminary round 
 All times are Philippine Standard Time (UTC+8:00).

Pool A 

|}

|}

Pool B 

|}

|}

Final round 
 All times are Philippine Standard Time (UTC+8:00).

9th–12th places

9th–12th semifinals 
|}

11th place match 
|}

9th place match 
|}

Final eight

Quarterfinals 
|}

5th–8th semifinals 
|}

7th place match 
|}

5th place match 
|}

Semifinals 
|}

3rd place match 
|}

Championship 
|}

Women's tournament

Preliminary round 
 All times are Philippine Standard Time (UTC+8:00).

Pool A 

|}

|}

Pool B 

|}

|}

Final round 
 All times are Philippine Standard Time (UTC+8:00).

Quarterfinals 
|}

5th–8th semifinals 
|}

7th place match 
|}

5th place match 
|}

Semifinals 
|}

3rd place match 
|}

Championship 
|}

Awards and medalists

Individual awards

Medalists

Final standings

See also 
 2022 Shakey's Super League Collegiate Pre-Season Tournament

References

External links 
 Official website

Volleyball competitions in the Philippines
2022 in volleyball
2022 in men's volleyball
2022 in women's volleyball
2022 in Philippine sport
VLCC
VLCC
VLCC